is a Japanese handball player for Hokkoku Bank and the Japanese national team.

She participated at the 2017 World Women's Handball Championship.

References

1989 births
Living people
Japanese female handball players
Handball players at the 2010 Asian Games
Handball players at the 2018 Asian Games
Asian Games silver medalists for Japan
Asian Games bronze medalists for Japan
Asian Games medalists in handball
Medalists at the 2010 Asian Games
Medalists at the 2018 Asian Games
Sportspeople from Kagawa Prefecture
Handball players at the 2020 Summer Olympics
20th-century Japanese women
21st-century Japanese women